The Music City Bowl is a post-season American college football bowl game certified by the NCAA that has been played in Nashville, Tennessee, since 1998. Since 2020, it has been sponsored by TransPerfect and is officially known as the TransPerfect Music City Bowl. Previous title sponsors include American General Life & Accident (1998), HomePoint.com (1999), Gaylord Entertainment (2002–2003), both Gaylord Entertainment and Bridgestone (2004–2009), and Franklin American Mortgage Company (2010–2019). From 2014 through 2019, the bowl had tie-ins with the Atlantic Coast Conference (ACC), Big Ten Conference, and Southeastern Conference (SEC); for 2020 through 2025, the bowl has tie-ins with the Big Ten and SEC.

The 2020 edition, slated for December 30 between Missouri and Iowa, was cancelled on December 27 due to COVID-19 issues within Missouri's program.

History

The first Music City Bowl was played at Vanderbilt Stadium in 1998. Beginning in 1999, the game was moved to the just completed home stadium of the Tennessee Titans, now known as Nissan Stadium. American General Life & Accident (now a subsidiary of AIG) sponsored the inaugural 1998 game, and the now-defunct "homepoint.com" sponsored the 1999 game. There was no sponsor in 2000 or 2001. In 2002, with title sponsorship from Nashville-based Gaylord Hotels, the game became known as the Gaylord Hotels Music City Bowl. In 2003, Bridgestone became the presenting sponsor of the game, and its full title became the Gaylord Hotels Music City Bowl presented by Bridgestone.  Bridgestone dropped its presenting sponsorship following the 2007 game. Beginning with the 2010 game, Franklin American Mortgage served as title sponsor, with Gaylord continuing as a major sponsor of the event. In December 2019, it was announced that TransPerfect, a New York City-based translation services company, would take over title sponsorship of the bowl for the 2020 through 2025 playings.

Conference tie-ins
The game initially featured a matchup between representatives of the Southeastern Conference (SEC) and the Big East Conference. The Big East was replaced by the Big Ten Conference in 2002. Beginning with the 2006 game, the Big Ten was replaced by the Atlantic Coast Conference (ACC). The ACC also took part in the 2005 game, when Virginia appeared because the SEC did not have enough bowl-eligible teams. For six seasons beginning in 2014, the Music City Bowl shared its tie in with the Gator Bowl (also known as the TaxSlayer Bowl for several playings), to match an SEC team with either an ACC or Big Ten team. In June 2019, the Music City Bowl announced an extension to their agreement with the SEC, and an agreement for the Big Ten to provide teams for the 2020 through 2025 seasons.

Game results

The Music City Bowl has a history of upsets. The biggest underdog win was when Kentucky (+10) defeated Clemson 28–20 in 2006. Other big upsets include Minnesota (+7) defeating Arkansas 29–14 in 2002, and Virginia (+6) defeating Minnesota 34–31 in 2005. Boston College was a four-point underdog when they defeated Georgia 20–16 in 2001, West Virginia was a three-point underdog when they beat Ole Miss in 2000, Syracuse was a three-point underdog when they defeated Kentucky in 1999, and Minnesota was a one-point underdog when they beat Alabama in 2004. In 2008, four-point underdog Vanderbilt, making their first bowl appearance since 1982, upset Boston College, 24th in the BCS rankings, 16–14.

All rankings are taken from the AP Poll prior to the game being played.

Source:

Most Valuable Players

Most appearances
Updated through the December 2022 edition (24 games, 48 total appearances).

Teams with multiple appearances

Teams with a single appearance
Won (8): Iowa, North Carolina, Northwestern, Notre Dame, Syracuse, Virginia, Virginia Tech, West Virginia

Lost (10): Arkansas, Florida State, Georgia, Georgia Tech, LSU, NC State, Nebraska, Texas A&M, Wake Forest, Wisconsin

Appearances by conference
Updated through the December 2022 edition (24 games, 48 total appearances).

 Independent appearances: Notre Dame (2014)
 The American Athletic Conference (The American) retains the conference charter of the Big East following the 2013 split of the original Big East along football lines.

Game records
The most lopsided game was Auburn's 63–14 win over Purdue in the 2018 edition. Auburn's 63 points (56 in the first half alone, a record for a half in any bowl game) is the bowl's high score, while Alabama's 7 points in 1998 is the low score. The closest game was Vanderbilt's 16–14 win over Boston College in 2008. This also marked the lowest point total in the bowl's history. The 87 point total in the 2000 edition, when West Virginia defeated Ole Miss, 49–38, is a high for the bowl. A new attendance record for the bowl of 69,489 was set by the 2021 game, surpassing the prior record of 69,143 that had been set by the 2010 game.

Media coverage

The bowl has been televised by ESPN since its inception.

Notes

References

External links
 

 
College football bowls
Sports competitions in Nashville, Tennessee
American football in Tennessee
College sports in Tennessee
Recurring sporting events established in 1998